Höga Kusten Flyg was a virtual airline based in Örnsköldsvik, Sweden. It operated scheduled services in Sweden using aircraft and flight codes of its subsidiary Nextjet or other operators.

History 
The airline was established in 2007 to operate domestic flights between Stockholm, Sweden and Örnsköldsvik, Sweden. In December 2012 it bought the much bigger Swedish airline Nextjet and merged its operations with it.

Destinations 
Höga Kusten Flyg operated the following services in December 2015: 

 Sweden
Stockholm - Stockholm-Arlanda Airport
Örnsköldsvik - Örnsköldsvik Airport

Fleet 
As of December 2015 the Höga Kusten Flyg fleet included the following aircraft:

See also
 Airlines
 Transport in Sweden

References

External links
Höga Kusten Flyg

Defunct airlines of Sweden 
Airlines established in 2007
Airlines disestablished in 2017
Swedish companies established in 2007